The Four Feathers is a 1929 American war film directed by Merian C. Cooper and starring William Powell, Richard Arlen, Clive Brook and Fay Wray. This was the third of numerous film versions of the 1902 novel The Four Feathers written by A. E. W. Mason. The 1929 version of The Four Feathers premiered at the Criterion Theatre in New York City on June 12, 1929.

Plot
As children, Harry promises to marry Ethne, both the offspring of English Army officers, but she consents only if he will dress as a soldier. When Harry is still a child, his father tells him stories about the Crimean War, including one where a runaway soldier is spurred into suicide by Harry's father, who sent him a white feather to show his disapproval of cowardice.

As a young man, Harry joins the Royal West Kent Regiment and is engaged to Ethne. His best friends are Durrance, Trench, and Castleton. Harry receives a telegram that their regiment is being deployed to the Soudan Expedition, and he resigns from the army. His friends and Ethne find out why Harry resigned and give him four white feathers. Harry's father also disapproves, and before he dies, he gives his son a pistol and tells him to shoot himself. Harry decides to act courageously in front of his friends in order to get them to take back their feathers, and travels to Sudan.

In the Sudan, Trench has been captured by the enemy. Harry saves him, and Trench takes back the white feather. Harry stops a mutiny and saves Castelton from an ambush. Ethne and Harry get back together.

Cast

 Richard Arlen as Lt. Harry Feversham
 Fay Wray as Ethne Eustace
 Clive Brook as Lt. Jack Durrance
 William Powell as Capt. William Trench
 Theodore von Eltz as Lt. Castleton
 Noah Beery Sr. as Slave Trader
 Zack Williams as Idris
 Noble Johnson as Ahmed
 Philippe De Lacy as Harry, age 10
 E. J. Ratcliffe as Col. Eustace
 George Fawcett as Col. Feversham

Production
The picture has the distinction of being one of the last major Hollywood pictures of the silent era. It was also released by Paramount Pictures in a version with a Movietone soundtrack with music and sound effects only. The studio considered making it a full talkie, and acquired the dialogue rights to the story for an additional $2,500 on top of the silent rights for which they had paid $12,500.

The book the film was based on, The Four Feathers (1902), was one of the only books in Cooper's possession while he served as a volunteer for the Polish resistance in Kościuszko's Squadron. Cooper found the book inspirational. Kamran Rastegar, associate professor of Arabic and comparative literature at Tufts University, noted several parallels between Cooper's life and that of the protagonist of Four Feathers: both were born into military families, expelled from naval colleges, voluntarily enlisted, and escaped from military prisons. Cooper embraced the ideology both of the masculine ideal and the colonial idea that white men had a right to rule over others.

Cooper, Shoedsack, and Shoedsack's wife, Ruth Rose, traveled to Tanzania and Sudan to shoot parts of the film in 1927. Cooper wrote "Two Fighting Tribes of Sudan" for a 1929 National Geographic article using material from the expedition. Film from the expedition was interweaved with parts shot on sets in Hollywood. Actors were not transported to Sudan, which helped reduce filming costs. Four Feathers was one of the first films to use this technique. Cooper oversaw trapping hippopotamuses for a scene where they stampede into a river, and three people died in the process. After a few native villagers went home during the trapping of hippos, Cooper beat "every native he could find." Cooper observed the baboons for three months before capturing them, and his notes filled 800 pages. Cooper also put baboons on a suspension bridge over a river and cut it down in order to film them trying to swim to safety. Back in California, the producers built a large camp between Palm Springs and Indio to shoot the actors themselves in fight scenes. Cooper and Shoedsack hired African-Americans from Los Angeles to stand in for Hadendoan Sudanese men.

Adolph Zukor, Paramont studio head, insisted on the film being silent, though directors wanted it to be a talkie. The film was billed as the "last of the big silent films" even though it had a soundtrack and sound effects. According to Thomas Schatz, producer Selznick saved the film from disaster by conducting retakes and reediting the film after its initial preview. Cooper requested that Selznick stay off of the set, and Selznick complied. However, Cooper was supposed to approve of Selznik's edits, but was away during postproduction of The Four Feathers. He disliked the new takes.

Criticism
Peter Limbrick, assistant professor in film and digital media at the University of California, Santa Cruz, noted that Four Feathers is a masculine adventure that values power above other virtues and excludes women. Limbrick also noted that the way the film used African-American extras in California to stand in for Hadendoans in Sudan reflected the way white settlers like Cooper viewed their position in society in the United States as mirroring that of the British colonialists invading Sudan. Cooper's comments to others while abroad showed that he viewed all black people as racially inferior, a settler superiority that leads to the narrative found in The Four Feathers, which is "responding less to the facts of the land than to preexisting colonial visions of it, and disavowing indigenous habitation and meaning." Jeffrey Richards referenced how the characters of the young soldiers fulfilled the "Imperial hero" archetype: tall, thin, and mustached.

Kamran Rastegar notes that Cooper's Feversham shows resentment and anger when reincorporated into the military and reunited with Ethne. Rather than transforming from a coward to a hero, Feversham seems to be a hero who "has only now found recognition for what he always had been." According to Rastegar, Cooper's Feversham improved on colonial forms of masculinity by having him display "a brooding sense of ressentiment." Fear of "a corruption of masculinity" is a constant theme in this and other versions of The Four Feathers; the fantasy of redemption through service to an empire leads to "a revalorization of" colonialism.

Accolades
The film is recognized by American Film Institute in these lists:
 2006: AFI's 100 Years...100 Cheers – Nominated

References

Bibliography
 Bryant, Roger. William Powell: The Life and Films. McFarland, 2014.

External links

 
 
 
 
Collection on The Four Feathers, 1929, L. Tom Perry Special Collections, Harold B. Lee Library, Brigham Young University
Merian C. Cooper papers on The Four Feathers, 1927-1929, 1957, L. Tom Perry Special Collections, Harold B. Lee Library, Brigham Young University

1929 films
1920s historical films
1929 war films
American silent feature films
American black-and-white films
American historical films
American war films
1920s English-language films
Films based on The Four Feathers
Films directed by Ernest B. Schoedsack
Films directed by Merian C. Cooper
Films set in Sudan
Films set in England
Films set in the 19th century
Films with screenplays by Howard Estabrook
Paramount Pictures films
Transitional sound films
Harold B. Lee Library-related film articles
1920s American films
Films about the British Army
Silent adventure films
Silent war films
Silent American drama films